The Forum River Center (known locally as The Forum) is a multi-purpose arena and convention center in Rome, Georgia, United States.  It seats 2,140 for arena football, up to 3,116 for other sporting events and up to 3,932 for concerts.  For trade shows, it can accommodate 21,000 square feet (2,000 m2) of space.  Meeting rooms at the Forum total an additional 14,269 square feet (1326 m2) of space.  Floyd County owns the Forum. The Forum was previously home to the Georgia Fire indoor football team.

External links

Forum River Center official website

Indoor arenas in Georgia (U.S. state)
Convention centers in Georgia (U.S. state)
Sports venues in Georgia (U.S. state)
Buildings and structures in Rome, Georgia